Štorovje is a former settlement in the Municipality of Moravče in central Slovenia. It is now part of the village of Drtija. The area is part of the traditional region of Upper Carniola. The municipality is now included in the Central Slovenia Statistical Region.

Geography
Štorovje lies southeast of the main part of the village of Drtija, below the Slivna Ridge.

History
Štorovje is among the comparatively more recent settlements in the area. Štorovje had a population of seven living in two houses in 1900. Štorovje was annexed by Drtija in 1952, ending its existence as an independent settlement.

References

External links

Štorovje on Geopedia

Populated places in the Municipality of Moravče
Former settlements in Slovenia